The men's high jump at the 2002 European Athletics Championships were held at the Olympic Stadium on August 6–8.

Medalists

Results

Qualification
Qualification: Qualifying Performance 2.28 (Q) or at least 12 best performers (q) advance to the final.

Group A

Group B

Final

External links
Results (PDF) at Real Federación Española de Atletismo

High
High jump at the European Athletics Championships